Alwara Höfels (born 6 April 1982) is a  German actress who works both in front of the camera and on the theater stage.

Biography
Alwara Höfels was born 6 April 1982 in Kronberg im Taunus. She is the daughter of actors Klara Höfels and Michael Greiling. She attended the Ernst Busch Academy of Dramatic Arts from 2002 to 2007 where she studied drama.  She was also  part of the ensemble cast at the Deutsches Theater (Berlin) from 2006 to 2009. There she worked with directors Jürgen Gosch and Christoph Mehler.

Well-known for her first role in Rabbit Without Ears where she played the Miriam, Höfels got a role in the TV show 13 Hours: Race Against Time. In 2016 she played the part of an inspector in the Dresden Detectives episodes of the TV series Tatort, working alongside Karin Hanczewski and Martin Brambach. She also performed in a number of smaller roles on stage and on TV. In 2014 Höfels won the Hessian Television Awards' Best Actress award. She lives in Berlin.

Filmography

Film
 2007: Rabbit Without Ears
 2009: Phantomschmerz
 2010: When We Leave
 2011: Blutzbrüdaz
 2011: Einer wie Bruno
 2012: Famous Five
 2013: Fack ju Göhte
 2015: Frau Müller muss weg!
 2015: Fack ju Göhte 2
 2018: Meine teuflisch gute Freundin
 2018: So viel Zeit

Television

 2007: GSG 9 – Ihr Einsatz ist ihr Leben (TV series, episode 1x12)
 2008: Post Mortem (TV series, episode 2x04)
 2008: Werther
 2008: Bella Block: Das Schweigen der Kommissarin, Teil 1 und Teil 2
 2009: Tatort: Architektur eines Todes
 2009: Mein Flaschengeist und ich
 2009: Rahel – eine preußische Affäre
 2010–2012: Allein gegen die Zeit (TV series, 23 episodes)
 2010: Der Doc und die Hexe
 2010: Mord mit Aussicht (TV series, episode 1x10)
 2010: Leipzig Homicide (TV series, episode 15x10)
 2011: Mein Bruder, sein Erbe und ich
 2011: Der Uranberg
 2011: Weihnachtsengel küsst man nicht
 2012: Tatort: Schmuggler
 2012: Wilsberg: Die Bielefeld-Verschwörung
 2012: Tatort: Alles hat seinen Preis
 2012: Überleben an der Wickelfront
 2013: Crime Scene Cleaner (TV series, episode 2x02)
 2013: Krokodil
 2013: Mord nach Zahlen
 2013: The Old Fox (TV series, episode 370)
 2014: Tatort – Der Eskimo
 2014: Einmal Bauernhof und zurück (TV film)
 2014: Die Fischerin
 2014: Dr. Gressmann zeigt Gefühle
 2015: Sturköpfe
 2016: Das Programm
 2016–2018: Tatort – Team Sieland, Gorniak und Schnabel
 2016: Auf einen Schlag
 2016: Der König der Gosse
 2017: Level X
 2017: Auge um Auge
 2018: Déjà-vu
 2018: Wer jetzt allein ist
 2016: Mein Sohn, der Klugscheißer
 2016: Der Andere
 2017: Das doppelte Lottchen
 2017: Harter Brocken – Die Kronzeugin
 2018: Aufbruch in die Freiheit
 2018: Keiner schiebt uns weg
 2019: Mein Freund, das Ekel

References

1982 births
Living people
People from Kronberg im Taunus
German stage actresses
German television actresses
German film actresses